Kibatalia puberula is a species of plant in the family Apocynaceae. It is endemic to the Philippines.

References

Endemic flora of the Philippines
puberula
Endangered plants
Taxonomy articles created by Polbot
Taxa named by Elmer Drew Merrill